Tarina Tsho (Tsho: lake) is one of the lakes of Bhutan that is a major contributor to GLOF danger in the country. It was the source of 1983 GLOF that destroyed part of Punakha Dzong.

References

Lakes of Bhutan